Nguyễn Trãi (阮廌), pen name Ức Trai (抑齋); (1380–1442) was an illustrious Vietnamese Confucian scholar, a noted poet, a skilled politician and a master strategist. He was at times attributed with being capable of almost miraculous or mythical deeds in his designated capacity as a principal advisor of Lê Lợi, who fought against the Ming dynasty. He is credited with writing the important political statements of Lê Lợi and inspiring the Vietnamese populace to support open rebellion against the Ming dynasty rulers. He is also the author of "Great Proclamation upon the Pacification of the Wu" (Bình Ngô đại cáo).

Biography

Early life
Nguyễn Trãi originally was from Hải Dương Province, he was born in 1380 in Thăng Long (present day Hanoi), the capital of the declining Trần dynasty.  Under the brief Hồ dynasty, he passed examination and served for a time in the government.  In 1406, Ming forces invaded and conquered Vietnam.  Under the occupation, the Ming China attempted to convert Vietnam into a Chinese province and ruthlessly quashed all rebellions.

War of independence

In 1417, Nguyễn Trãi joined a rebel leader named Lê Lợi, who was resisting the occupation from a mountainous region in Thanh Hóa Province south of Hanoi.  Nguyễn Trãi served as the chief advisor, strategist and propagandist for the movement.

The war of independence leading to the defeat of the Ming and the inauguration of the Lê dynasty lasted from 1417 to 1427.  From 1417 until 1423, Lê Lợi conducted a classic guerilla campaign from his bases in the mountains.  Following a negotiated truce, Lê Lợi, following the advice of Nguyễn Chích, led his army to the southern prefecture of Nghệ An. From Nghệ An, Vietnamese forces won many battles and gained control over the whole part of Vietnam from Thanh Hóa southwards. The Ming sent a series of military reinforcements in response to bolster their positions.  In 1426, the army of a Chinese general named Wang Tong arrived in the Red River Delta.  However, Vietnamese forces were able to cut supply lines and control the countryside, leaving Chinese presence totally isolated in the capital and other citadels.  During this period, Nguyễn Trãi sought to undermine the resolve of the enemy and to negotiate a favorable peace by sending a series of missives to the Ming commanders. In 1427 the Ming emperor Xuande sent two large reinforcing armies to Vietnam. Lê Lợi moved his forces to the frontier, where they confronted and utterly defeated Chinese reinforcements in a series of bloody battles, most notably the battle of Chi Lăng-Xương Giang. Wang Tong sued for peace.  The numerous Chinese prisoners of war were all given provisions and allowed to return to China.  Nguyễn Trãi penned a famous proclamation of victory.

Later life
After the war Nguyễn Trãi was elevated by Lê Lợi to an exalted position in the new court but internal intrigues, sycophantic machinations and clannish nepotism meant he was not appointed regent upon the emperor's death. Instead that position was bestowed upon Lê Sát, who ruled as regent on behalf of the young heir Lê Thái Tông.

At some point during the regency of Lê Sát, having found life at court increasingly difficult, Nguyễn Trãi retired to his country home north of Hanoi in the tranquil mountains of Chí Linh, where he enjoyed poetry writing and meditation. Today, visitors can visit this site where a large shrine of remembrance, covering from the foot of the mountain to the top is erected to honour the national hero. The site of Nguyễn Trãi's house still exists, however only the tiled floors remain original. Close by is an ancient Buddhist temple, which has stood there several centuries before his time.

Death

Nguyễn Trãi's  death resulted from a scandal involving the young emperor, Lê Thái Tông, and the wife or concubine of Nguyễn Trãi, named Nguyễn Thị Lộ. Early in 1442, the young emperor began an affair with Nguyễn Thị Lộ. This affair continued when the emperor visited the old scholar at his home. Not long after having left, Lê Thái Tông suddenly became ill and died. The nobles at the court blamed Nguyễn Thị Lộ for the young emperor's death, accused them of regicide and had both, along with most members of their extended families, executed.

Twenty years later, Lê Thái Tông's son, emperor Lê Thánh Tông officially pardoned Nguyễn Trãi, saying that he was wholly innocent in the death of Thánh Tông's father. He was given the posthumous noble title the Count of Tán Trù

Legacy

According to Loren Baritz ("Backfire: A History of How American Culture Led Us Into Vietnam and Made Us Fight the Way We Did", 1985), Trai set down the Vietnamese strategy against the Chinese in an essay.  This essay would prove to be very close to the Communists' strategy of insurgency.  Specifically you must, "subordinate military action to the political and moral struggle...better to conquer hearts than citadels."

Most cities in Vietnam have named major streets after him.

Family
Nguyễn Trãi had five wives (or concubines) and seven sons.

Wive/Concubines:

• Lady Phạm Đỗ Minh Hiển

• Lady Phùng Thành

• Lady Nguyễn Thị Lộ

• Lady Phạm Thị Mẫn

• Lady Trần Anh Minh

Sons:

• Nguyễn Khuê (Lady Trần's)

• Nguyễn Ứng (Lady Trần's)

• Nguyễn Phù (Lady Trần's)

• Nguyễn Bảng (Lady Phùng's)

• Nguyễn Tích (Lady Phùng's)

• Nguyễn Anh Vũ (Lady Phạm's)

• Forefather of a Nguyễn family's branch in Quế Lĩnh, Phương Quất, Kinh Môn District, Hải Dương Province. (Lady Lê's)

Notable descendants:

• Nguyễn Thiện Thuật

• Nguyễn Văn Cừ

Work 
Being both a military tactician and a poet, Nguyễn Trãi's works varied in many areas ranging from literature, history, geography, ceremony and propriety; many of them were missing after his execution. Most of his poems that survive until today were collected in Ức Trai Thi Tập (Ức Trai's Poems Collection) by Dương Bá Cung, printed in 1868 under Nguyễn dynasty. His poems, written in both ancient Chinese (Hán) and Vietnamese (Nôm), were highly regarded by notable philosophers, poets, and politicians in Vietnamese history.

In 2010, Vietnamese poet Nguyễn Đỗ and American poet Paul Hoover published the first collection of Nguyễn Trãi's poetry in English translation, titled Beyond the Court Gate: Selected Poems. The collection reflects Nguyễn Trãi's metaphysical contemplation of tiny details in everyday life, but at the same time set him apart from Li Po's uses of extreme imaginary and formal poetic rules. Nguyễn Trãi's poems demonstrate wit, humility, and a conversational tone, and express his personal perception and experience. 

An example of Nguyễn Trãi's writing is his poem To a Friend (Traditional Chinese: 記友, Sino-Vietnamese: Kí Hữu, Vietnamese: Gửi Bạn), as translated and edited by Nguyễn Đỗ and Paul Hoover:

記友

半生世路嘆屯邅， 

萬事惟應付老天。 

寸舌但存空自信， 

一寒如故亦堪憐。 

光陰焂忽時難再， 

客舍凄涼夜似年。 

十載讀書貧到骨， 

盤惟苜蓿坐無氈。

To a Friend
My fate naturally has many twists and sharp turns,So in everything I trust in the wisdom of Heaven.I still have my tongue—believe me, I am able to talk,Even though I'm still poor and, as we know, pathetic.Never to return, the past flies too quickly and the time is short,But, wandering in this cold room, the night is far too long.I’ve been reading books for ten years, but I'm poor from clothes to boneFrom eating only vegetables and sitting without a cushion.ReferencesBeyond the Court Gate''. Selected poetry of Nguyen Trai, edited and translated Nguyen Do and Paul Hoover (Counterpath Press, USA, 2010)
 https://web.archive.org/web/20120113060121/http://www.zolandpoetry.com/reviews/2011/v2/TraiFreemanDoppelt.html
 http://media.sas.upenn.edu/pennsound/groups/XCP/XCP_223_Hoover_11-17-10.mp3
 http://www.thienlybuutoa.org/LichSu-VanHoa/biography-NguyenTrai.htm
 https://ecommons.cornell.edu/bitstream/handle/1813/13117/Wolters_TranVietnam.pdf?sequence=1

Footnotes
 

1380 births
1442 deaths
Victims of familial execution
People from Hải Dương province
Lê dynasty officials
Vietnamese Confucianists
Vietnamese male poets
Lê dynasty writers
Lê dynasty poets